I Hate Music may refer to:

I Hate Music (album), by Superchunk, 2013
I Hate Music (song cycle), by Leonard Bernstein, 1943
"I Hate Music", a song by the Replacements from Sorry Ma, Forgot to Take Out the Trash, 1981

See also
"I Hate the Music", a song by John Paul Young, 1976
I Hate the Music (album), by John Paul Young, 2009
Ich hasse Musik, an album by Knorkator